Dizaj-e Tavil (also Romanized as Dīzaj-e Ţavīl; also known as Dīzaj) is a village in Yowla Galdi Rural District, in the Central District of Showt County, West Azerbaijan Province, Iran. At the 2006 census, its population was 410, in 89 families.

References 

Populated places in Showt County